The Monastery of Our Lady of Kazan (Kazanskiy monastyr) is a Russian Orthodox monastery in Tambov, Russia.  It is dedicated to the Theotokos of Kazan.

The monastery was founded in 1670.  In 1758 it was declared the main residence of local bishops. The monastery was closed in 1918 after the Russian Revolution. In 1992 the monastery reopened and underwent renovation. The renovation was completed in 2007.

The main church was consecrated in 1796. A small chapel commemorating the victims of the Tambov Rebellion was unveiled by Alexios II in 1993.

The monastery has the tallest belltower in Central Russia, rising to a height of 107 meters. This Neoclassical campanile was built between 2009 and 2014 to replace a smaller structure demolished by the Communists.

References

External links 
 

1670 establishments in Russia
1918 disestablishments in Russia
1992 establishments in Russia
Religious buildings and structures completed in 1670
Russian Orthodox monasteries in Russia
Buildings and structures in Tambov Oblast
Religious organizations established in the 1670s
Christian monasteries established in the 17th century
Objects of cultural heritage of Russia of regional significance
Cultural heritage monuments in Tambov Oblast